Wickliffe Rose (November 19, 1862 in Saulsbury, Tennessee – September 5, 1931 in British Columbia) was the first director of the International Health Board of the Rockefeller Foundation and won the Public Welfare Medal in 1931.

Rose became director of the Sanitary Commission for the Eradication of Hookworm in the South in 1910. He worked for the foundation until 1914.

Rose died of heart disease.

References

Science and philanthropy: Wickliffe Rose and the International Education Board. Robert E. Kohler. Minerva (Impact Factor: 1.24). 02/1985; 23(1):75-95. DOI: 10.1007/BF01097841 Source: PubMed

External  link

1862 births
1931 deaths
American public health doctors
Johns Hopkins Bloomberg School of Public Health